Tom Sawyer  is a 3-LP box set containing a reading by Bing Crosby of an abridged version of Mark Twain’s classic story The Adventures of Tom Sawyer. It was recorded for Argo Records (UK) on September 3 and 5, 1975 at Argo Studios, 115 Fulham Road, London.

Background music in the natural breaks in the story was composed by David T. Reilly and played by his father Tommy Reilly on the harmonica.

The album has never been issued on CD.

Background
Executive producer Geoff Milne described the background in a magazine article after Crosby’s death. “Argo wanted to do something to commemorate the American Bicentennial celebrations, and it seemed a good idea to do Tom Sawyer - we all agreed that the only person who could relate the story was Bing Crosby…The recordings were done in two sessions, one lasting four hours and the other two and one-half hours...It was interesting to watch him in the studios. He was on his feet throughout the sessions. And he didn’t just read Tom Sawyer, he was actually acting the parts. His voice took on different tones and characters. He put a lot into it and I believe that it comes across in the records.”

Most of the sound effects on the album were done by Geoff Milne himself – the sound in the cave for instance was achieved by recording a dripping tap in the Decca washroom and then doctoring the effect appropriately.

Reception
Mary Postgate writing in the UK publication, the Gramophone liked the box set. "This abridged version of a well-loved story is one of the most enjoyable sets to have come my way in recent years. It was a master stroke to get Bing Crosby to read it, for the ‘Old Groaner’ has a devastatingly charming manner, compounded of a relaxed and sympathetic delivery and a lovely speaking voice. The vocal cords that kept him at the very top in music and musical films for so many years are just as velvety now...Crosby’s masterly reading needs little help. Delicate, dry, humorous but never whimsical or condescending, he is one of the most delightful readers Argo has offered us. The quality of the sound is exceptionally fine. Highly recommended."

Crosby researcher and author Fred Reynolds summed the album up saying, "the exploits of Tom, living with his Aunt Polly in a small town on the Missouri, and his companion Huckleberry Finn are refreshingly recaptured in Crosby’s reading. . . . Bing’s expressive narrative and his dialect voicing of the characters enhance an impressive and entertaining story."

Track listing
SIDE ONE
 Tom Escapes from Aunt Polly
 The new boy
 Whitewash!
 Becky Thatcher is admired
 Huckleberry Finn
 At School
 Tom Meets Becky

SIDE TWO
 An engagement
 Tom and Huck in the graveyard
 Muff Potter and Injun Joe
 The murder
 A solemn oath
 Pain-killer!
 Becky rejects Tom

SIDE THREE
 Tom, Huck and Joe Harper run away
 Jackson's Island
 Supper and homesickness
 Exploring the Island
 Have the boys drowned?
 The Storm
 A Resurrection
 Tom and Amy Lawrence
 A blotted spelling book and a torn picture.

SIDE FOUR
 Mr. Dobbins discovers the books
 Muff Potter in jail
 The Trial
 Injun Joe escapes
 Digging for Treasure
 The haunted house
 Injun Joe returns

SIDE FIVE
 The Temperance Tavern
 Injun Joe's 'Number Two'
 The Picnic
 McDougal's Cave
 Huck saves the Widow Douglas
 Tom and Becky are lost
 At Church
 The Searchers

SIDE SIX
 In the cave
 Injun Joe returns
 The children are found
 Tom and Huck explore the cave
 The Treasure
 A Party
 Huck is introduced into society

References 

1975 albums
Bing Crosby albums
Argo Records (UK) albums
Works based on The Adventures of Tom Sawyer